Polystira gruneri is a species of sea snail, a marine gastropod mollusk in the family Turridae, the turrids.

Description

Distribution
This species occurs off Martinique in the Caribbean Sea and off Puerto Rico.

References

  Todd J.A. & Rawlings T.A. (2014). A review of the Polystira clade — the Neotropic’s largest marine gastropod radiation (Neogastropoda: Conoidea: Turridae sensu stricto). Zootaxa. 3884(5): 445–491

gruneri
Gastropods described in 1848
Taxa named by Rodolfo Amando Philippi